

HR 8799 c is an extrasolar planet located approximately 129 light-years away in the constellation of Pegasus, orbiting the 6th magnitude Lambda Boötis star HR 8799. This planet has a mass between 5 and 10 Jupiter masses and a radius from 20 to 30% larger than Jupiter's.  It orbits at 38 AU from HR 8799 with an unknown eccentricity and a period of 190 years; it is the 2nd planet discovered in the HR 8799 system.  Along with two other planets orbiting HR 8799, this planet was discovered on November 13, 2008 by Marois et al., using the Keck and the Gemini observatories in Hawaii.  These planets were discovered using the direct imaging technique. In January 2010, HR 8799 c became the 3rd exoplanet to have a portion of its spectrum directly observed (following 2M1207b and 1RXS J1609b), confirming the feasibility of direct spectrographic studies of exoplanets.

Spectra

Near infrared spectroscopy from 995 to 1769 nanometers made with the Palomar Observatory show evidence of Ammonia, perhaps some Acetylene but neither Carbon Dioxide nor substantial Methane.
High resolution spectroscopy with the OSIRIS instrument on the Keck Observatory show numerous well resolved lines of molecular absorption in the planet's atmosphere in the K band.  Although methane is absent, the planet's atmosphere contains both water and carbon monoxide; the carbon-to-oxygen ratio of HR 8799 c is higher than that of its star, suggesting that the planet formed through the core accretion process.

Later, in November 2018, researchers confirmed the existence of water and the absence of methane in the atmosphere of HR 8799c, using high-resolution spectroscopy and near-infrared adaptive optics (NIRSPAO) at the Keck Observatory.

The detection of water and carbon monoxide in planetary atmosphere was announced in 2021.

See also
 Fomalhaut b

Notes

References

External links

 

HR 8799
Exoplanets discovered in 2008
Giant planets
Pegasus (constellation)
Exoplanets detected by direct imaging